The Battle of Zarghan was the last battle of Ashraf Hotaki's career as a statesman. Having been repeatedly bludgeoned by Nader's army through the Battles of Mihmandoost and Murche-Khort Ashraf had withdrawn from Isfahan and escaped south to Shiraz to rebuild his army in an ultimately futile attempt to reverse his fortunes. Although he found some local support amongst a few of the tribes he was decisively beaten, for the last time, after which he disappeared from Persia as well as the historical records, with no consensus being reached concerning the manner of his demise.

The battle 

Nader spent a total of 40 days in the capital attending to mostly political matters before setting out south for a final decisive engagement with Ashraf. Approximately 30 kilometers north of Shiraz he found Ashraf's forces who were charged against his lines before being deployed fully. The battle occurred on the 15th of January 1730. The steady footed Persian musketeers beat off the assault with the same tactics they had developed and practised to perfection during their numerous clashes with Afghan cavalry in the past few years. The Persian artillery wreaked havoc on the columns of Afghans cavalry and Nader dispersed the infantry contingent of the Afghan army when he ordered a mighty cavalry charge of his own. Ashraf's mounted troops struck hard against Nader's infantry time and time again to only be beaten back by a murderous volume of fire until Ashraf had virtually lost all his horsemen.

The aftermath 

Ashraf attempted a negotiated settlement, sending over the Safavid princesses he had taken when he fled from Isfahan, although ultimately he would decide against surrendering himself and flee in the hope of reaching Qandahar. Nearing dusk a group of 500 Afsharid and Kurdish riders from the advance guard caught up with the Afghans close to Fesa bridge and merged with them into a wild melee which resulted in the Afghans trying to flee across the river where many of them drowned. The civilians and stragglers following Ashraf's camp were either enslaved or butchered, though it is worth mentioning Nader condemned his men's behaviour when he came within view of their actions, however, much of the criticism seems to have been directed at the men's failure to inform him of the events in a timely manner rather than their conduct.

See also
Battle of Gulnabad
Battle of Murche-Khort
Battle of Khwar Pass

References

Further reading
 Michael Axworthy, The Sword of Persia: Nader Shah, from Tribal Warrior to Conquering Tyrant Hardcover 348 pages (26 July 2006) Publisher: I.B. Tauris Language: English 

Damghan
Damghan
Conflicts in 1729
History of Semnan Province
1729 in Afghanistan